The Outerbridge Crossing, also known as the Outerbridge, is a cantilever bridge that spans the Arthur Kill between Perth Amboy, New Jersey, and Staten Island, New York.  It carries New York State Route 440 (NY 440) and New Jersey Route 440, with the two roads connecting at the state border near the bridge's center. The Outerbridge Crossing is one of three vehicular bridges connecting New Jersey with Staten Island, and like the others, is maintained and operated by the Port Authority of New York and New Jersey. The others are the Bayonne Bridge (also carrying Route 440), which connects Staten Island with Bayonne, and the Goethals Bridge (carrying I-278, which connects the island with Elizabeth).

Description

Constructed from 1925 to 1928, the bridge was named for Eugenius Harvey Outerbridge, the first chairman of the then–Port of New York Authority and a resident of Staten Island. Rather than calling it the "Outerbridge Bridge", the span was labeled a "crossing", but many New Yorkers and others mistakenly assume the name comes from the fact that it is the most remote bridge in New York City and the southernmost crossing in New York state.

The bridge is of a steel cantilever construction, designed by John Alexander Low Waddell and built under the auspices of the Port of New York Authority, now the Port Authority of New York and New Jersey, which currently operates it. It opened simultaneously with the first Goethals Bridge on June 29, 1928. Both spans had similar designs prior to replacement of the Goethals with the current cable-stayed bridge in 2018. Neither bridge saw high traffic counts until the opening of the Verrazzano-Narrows Bridge in 1964. Traffic counts on both bridges were also depressed due to the effects of the Great Depression and World War II.

The Outerbridge Crossing has undergone numerous repairs as a result of the high volume of traffic that crosses the bridge each day. On October 11, 2013, the Port Authority announced the completion of the bridge's repaving project.

On March 2, 2017, Port Authority Executive Director Patrick Foye announced the funding of a study into a potential replacement bridge.

Traffic
The Outerbridge Crossing carried 32,438,000 vehicles (both directions) in 2006, or approximately 90,000 each day.

Tolls
, the tolls-by-mail rate going from New Jersey to New York are $17 for cars and motorcycles; there is no toll for passenger vehicles going from New York to New Jersey. New Jersey and New York–issued E-ZPass users are charged $12.75 for cars and $11.75 for motorcycles during off-peak hours, and $14.75 for cars and $13.75 for motorcycles during peak hours. Users with E-ZPass issued from agencies outside of New Jersey and New York are charged the tolls-by-mail rate.

Tolls are only collected for eastbound traffic. Originally, tolls were collected in both directions. In August 1970, the toll was abolished for westbound drivers, and at the same time, eastbound drivers saw their tolls doubled. The tolls of eleven other New York–New Jersey and Hudson River crossings along a  stretch, from the Outerbridge Crossing in the south to the Rip Van Winkle Bridge in the north, were also changed to south- or eastbound-only at that time.

Motorists using the high-speed E-ZPass lanes cannot use exit 1 to  Page Avenue, which is located immediately after the toll plaza.

Open road tolling began on April 24, 2019. The tollbooths were dismantled, and drivers are no longer able to pay cash at the bridge. Instead, there are cameras mounted onto new overhead gantries located on the Staten Island side. A vehicle without E-ZPass has a picture taken of its license plate and a bill for the toll is mailed to its owner. For E-ZPass users, sensors detect their transponders wirelessly.

See also
List of bridges documented by the Historic American Engineering Record in New Jersey
List of bridges documented by the Historic American Engineering Record in New York (state)

References

External links

Port Authority: Outerbridge Crossing
Outerbridge Crossing Historic Overview at Steve Anderson's nycroads.com

Bridges completed in 1928
Port Authority of New York and New Jersey
Bridges in Staten Island
Perth Amboy, New Jersey
Toll bridges in New York City
Toll bridges in New Jersey
Bridges in Middlesex County, New Jersey
Historic American Engineering Record in New Jersey
Historic American Engineering Record in New York City
Road bridges in New York City
Road bridges in New Jersey
1928 establishments in New York (state)
Steel bridges in the United States
Cantilever bridges in the United States
1928 establishments in New Jersey
Interstate vehicle bridges in the United States
1928 establishments in New York City